Mark Lawrence may refer to:

Mark Lawrence (bishop) (born 1950), former Bishop of the Diocese of South Carolina
Mark Lawrence (musician), principal trombonist of the San Francisco Symphony Orchestra, 1974–2007 
Mark Lawrence (footballer) (born 1958), English football player
Mark Lawrence (ice hockey) (born 1972), Canadian ice hockey player
Mark Lawrence (rugby union) (born 1965), former rugby union player and current referee
Mark Lawrence (darts player) (born 1964), English darts player
Mark Lawrence (politician) (born 1958), American politician in Maine
Mark Lawrence (author) (born 1966), US/UK fantasy writer
Mark Lawrence (actor), British actor
Mark Christopher Lawrence (born 1964), American character actor, comedian and voice-over artist
Mark Lawrence (cricketer), English cricketer

See also
Marc Lawrence (1910–2005), American film character actor
Marc Lawrence (filmmaker) (born 1959), American film director